Fallen Angels is a team of fictional superhuman teenagers appearing in American comic books published by Marvel Comics. A spin-off of The New Mutants, the series starred Sunspot and Warlock along with the character Boom-Boom from X-Factor, along with several additional characters, many of whom were obscure Marvel figures.

The team's only appearances were in the Fallen Angels eight-issue limited series, written by Jo Duffy, which ran from April 1987 to November 1987. The series was originally titled Misfits. Early ads and solicitations for the series showed this title shortly before it was released. A second mini-series was planned but never published. All eight issues were reprinted in 2011 in paperback and hardcover volumes.

History
The group formed after Sunspot accidentally injured fellow New Mutant Cannonball, during a soccer game.  Shunned by his teammates (with the exceptions of Wolfsbane and Warlock), a guilt-ridden Sunspot left the team. Warlock, unwilling to let Sunspot be alone in such a state, followed after him. While living on the streets, the group befriended a young Korean girl named Chance, who had the ability to randomly enhance or inhibit the abilities of other mutants and Ariel, a teleporter that could turn doors into temporary gateways with her powers. Ariel and Chance lived with the longtime X-Men villain the Vanisher, who had reinvented himself as a Fagin-style mentor to a group of pickpockets that included Chance and Ariel. They were soon joined by Multiple Man and Siryn, two X-Men allies who were sent to locate the wayward New Mutants, and Vanisher's former star thief Boom Boom, whom Ariel recruited after a fight with Iceman. The group soon picked up several additional non-mutant members, a cyborg named Gomi and his two cybernetically enhanced psychic lobsters Bill and Don, and Moon-Boy and Devil Dinosaur, the later of whom accidentally stepped on and killed the psychic lobster Don.

Most of the eight issue mini-series focused upon Sunspot's guilt towards injuring Cannonball and the mystery of Ariel. It is eventually revealed that Ariel is an alien, from a planet called Coconut Grove, which had ceased to evolve and reached a genetic dead end.  Ariel's superiors sought to remedy that situation by studying mutation in other species. Taking her friends to visit her planet, the team is captured by Ariel's superiors for vivisection. Ariel herself was then betrayed, as it is revealed that she herself was a mutant: possessing a persuasion ability unlike any other members of her race. Gomi, whose abilities as a cyborg were unaffected by mutant inhibitor fields, was able to escape his cell and free the others, and Ariel used her persuasion ability to convince the Coconut Grove to let them leave peacefully. Returning home, Sunspot and Warlock declare their intention to rejoin the New Mutants and leave the group, while Siryn and Multiple Man decide to stay alongside their new friends.

Connection to X-Men franchise
Fallen Angels takes place at the same time as the events of New Mutants #53-58. Sunspot and Warlock's departure from the group to join the Fallen Angels, happens in Fallen Angels #1, which takes place before the events of New Mutants #53. During a party at the Hellfire Club, Magneto notices how the New Mutants are too worried about their missing friends to enjoy themselves. Writer Louise Simonson, who took over writing New Mutants with #55, makes multiple mentions of their departure and Sunspot and Warlock's return to the team in New Mutants #59 is a major plot point, with them arriving in time to rescue their friends from Cameron Hodge and the Right.

Boom Boom's departure from X-Factor would be seen in X-Factor #17 and in Fallen Angels #3; the Fallen Angels version showing the sequence from Boom Boom's point of view while X-Factor version from the point of view of Iceman. Like with Sunspot and Warlock, Boom Boom's return to the team would serve a major plot point involving Cameron Hodge and his anti-mutant group the Right. Boom Boom returns in X-Factor #22, just as Hodge's group has attacked the team's headquarters and kidnapped the group's young charges. Following them, Boom Boom plays a critical role in rescuing her friends and unmasking Hodge as the leader of the Right.

Multiple Man's involvement with the Fallen Angels (and his romance with Siryn during the mini-series) was later retconned as not being the main version of the character, but a renegade version of Madrox who drugged the real Jamie in order to take his place during the assignment. This renegade duplicate later appears in X-Factor #72-75, having aligned himself with Mr. Sinister to destroy the real Jamie Madrox, a plan that failed due to the duplicate being unable to replace the real Jamie as the dominant personality. Later, during the "Xcutioner's Song" story arc, Siryn encounters the real Jamie Madrox and is shocked that he does not remember their brief romance and time with the Fallen Angels.

Ariel would later become an unofficial X-Men during the group's time on the island nation Utopia. Her only appearance on the team would be during the "Second Coming" crossover, during which she was killed when a car she was driving was blown up by a stinger missile fired by the Church of Humanity, as part of a gambit to kill off all known teleporters (Vanisher, who was a member of X-Force at this time, was killed in similar fashion). In X-Men Legacy #260, the character was revealed to have survived, granted trapped between dimensions and freed by the X-Men.

Planned sequel
Marvel commissioned a sequel series in 1989, written by Jo Duffy and drawn by Colleen Doran. The sequel series would have jettisoned the various X-Men characters and focus instead on Chance, Ariel, Gomi, and Moon Boy; as well as introduce several new characters. The planned sequel however, was never published though the first two issues had been completed by Duffy and Doran.

Volume 2

Fallen Angels was relaunched in November 2019 as part of Dawn of X. Written by Bryan Edward Hill, and drawn by Szymon Kudranski, the initial team comprised Cable, Psylocke, and X-23.

Fallen Angels Members
In 1987, the team debuted in Fallen Angels #1.

Plot

According to the Marvel website, new series features Psylocke who finds herself in the Mutantkind world, "but when a face from her past returns only to be killed, she seeks help from others who feel similar to get vengeance."

Collected editions

References

Marvel Comics superhero teams
1987 comics debuts
Superhero comics